Diego José Conde Alcolado (born 28 October 1998) is a Spanish professional footballer who plays as a goalkeeper for Getafe CF.

Club career
Born in Madrid, Conde joined Atlético Madrid's youth setup in 2007. Promoted to the reserves ahead of the 2017–18 season, he made his senior debut on 19 November 2017 by starting in a 3–0 Segunda División B away loss against Deportivo Fabril.

After spending the season as a backup to Miguel San Román, Conde renewed his contract until 2021 on 1 July 2018, and was loaned to fellow third division side CDA Navalcarnero seventeen days later. Upon returning, he was assigned back to the B-team.

On 28 August 2020, Conde was loaned to Segunda División side CD Leganés, for one year. He made his professional debut on 20 September, starting in a 2–1 away loss against CD Lugo.

In July 2021, Conde joined La Liga side Getafe CF, initially as a third-choice behind Rubén Yáñez and David Soria.

Personal life
Conde's sister María is a professional basketball player.

References

External links

1998 births
Living people
Footballers from Madrid
Spanish footballers
Association football goalkeepers
Segunda División players
Segunda División B players
Atlético Madrid B players
CDA Navalcarnero players
Atlético Madrid footballers
CD Leganés players
Getafe CF footballers
Spain youth international footballers